Kunimi Station is the name of multiple train stations in Japan.

 Kunimi Station (Kōchi) - (国見駅) in Kōchi Prefecture
 Kunimi Station (Miyagi) - (国見駅) in Miyagi Prefecture